Ásbjörn Björnsson (born 20 October 1962) is an Icelandic former footballer who played as a midfielder. He won one cap for the Iceland national football team, coming on as a substitute for Sigurjón Kristjánsson in the 4–0 win over the Faroe Islands on 2 August 1982.

References
 

1962 births
Living people
Asbjorn Bjornsson
Association football midfielders
Asbjorn Bjornsson
Asbjorn Bjornsson